COOK (officially Cook Trading Ltd) is a manufacturer and retailer of frozen ready meals founded in 1997 by Edward Perry and Dale Penfold and based in Sittingbourne. Their founding statement is to 'cook using the same ingredients and techniques you would at home, so everything looks and tastes homemade'. Inspired by the taste of great home-cooking, they wanted to find a better way of doing business: working for people and the planet, not just profit. Ed ran the business with his brother James from 2000-2009. In 2017 Dale Penfold retired and today Ed leads the business alongside his sister Rosie, as co-CEOs.

The business turned 25 years old in 2022. It has received over 50 Great Taste Awards for their broad range of meals and puddings, which can be found in 850 independent retailers all over the UK. COOK has four kitchens, where everything is still prepared by hand as stated in the founding statement. There are 94 COOK shops across the country, and a nationwide home delivery service which was voted 'Best overall meal delivery service' by BBC Good Food in 2022.

COOK were a founding member of B Corp UK in 2013, part of the global movement of responsible businesses.

COOK is certified by the Living Wage Foundation and has been voted the Best British Food & Drink Company to work for by Best Companies. Their RAW talent programme to help people back into work after prison, homelessness and other challenges has been recognised with a Queens Award for Enterprise.

Products 

COOK's range of frozen meals comes in various portion sizes (typically 1, 2 and 4).They also produce party food, cakes and puddings, low-calorie Pots for One, children’s meals and Indian and Thai ranges. Over 90% of the products in their shops are made by COOK themselves, but they also stock a small range of specialised non-frozen goods supplied by Cotswold Fayre.

COOK have five Compassion in World Farming awards. Most recently COOK were recognised with a Good Turkey Award in 2020 for the work they have done with renowned turkey farmer Paul Kelly to create bespoke standards for their turkeys.

They offer 12 months of 10% off for new parents and 30% discount for community events in the communities where there are COOK shops. They also have gift cards.

Their home delivery service was voted 'Best overall meal delivery service' by BBC Good Food in 2022. Offering 'a breadth of main meals serving from 1 to 8 people, a broad entertaining range, hot and cold puddings, meal box bundles, seasonal ranges, lunch pots and more' (BBC Good Food)

History

Edward Perry had worked as a salesman for his parents’ frozen cake company. In 1997 he persuaded a chef and client, Dale Penfold, to leave his job in banqueting and start a frozen food business. They founded 'Cakes and Casseroles' in 1997 and a small kitchen was opened in Sittingbourne, with the first shop in Farnham soon after. They began working with their pudding supplier, Liz Dove, in July 1997 and within 9 months she supplied them exclusively. The company was renamed 'COOK' in 1999 and, having outgrown the original kitchen, it moved to a new site in Sittingbourne in 2000. By 2005 they had a total of 16 shops.

In 2006 the website cookfood.net was launched, enabling home delivery across the UK. In 2007 they launched the wholesale business, which now supplies over 850 farm shops and independent food companies around the UK.

In March 2005 COOK opened a new 31,000sq ft Kitchen facility in Sittingbourne to allow the business to continue to grow.

In 2009 COOK started to expand as a franchise business; over 30 of their shops are now franchises.

In 2013, COOK became one of the founding members of B Corp UK.

In 2015 the puddings kitchen in Somerset was bought out and officially became part of COOK still run by Liz Dove until her retirement in 2021.

In 2022 COOK opened its 94th shop in Didcot, Oxfordshire.

COOK opened its second savoury kitchen, COOK Classics, in Sittingbourne in 2020 and their fourth kitchen, COOK Pies and Pastry, is set to open in 2023.

Social impact 
In 2022 COOK received an award for consistency, celebrating 10 years in the top 100 of the Sunday Times Best Companies to Work For and have been recognised in that time for being the 'Best Food & Drink Company to Work For in the UK' (2021) and reaching the highest placed manufacturer ranking at 28th position in 2016.

A founding member of the B Corporation movement in the UK, they became one of the UK's first B Corporations in 2013, joining other businesses globally that consider their social and environmental impact along with their profits. B Corp certification is re-evaluated every three years and in 2021 COOK scored 104.1 To be certified as a B Corp you have to get 80 points to more. The areas of evaluation are Governance, Workers, Community, Environment, Customers. There are now 1000 B Corps in the UK.

In 2015 they were certified by the Living Wage Foundation, and committed to paying all of their employees at least an hourly rate set by an independent body, which is adjusted annually and considerably higher than the UK Government’s minimum wage.

COOK run a RAW Talent programme (RAW stands for Ready And Working), supporting people into work who would otherwise struggle to find a good job. This might be due to criminal conviction, time in prison, homelessness, mental health, addiction, neurodiversity or refugee status. Since the programme started in  2014 it has recruited over 150 people through the scheme. In 2022 the program hosted its first-ever training on site at Wandsworth Prison and the programme was awarded a Queen's Award for Enterprise in March 2022.

COOK have partnered with the charity One Feeds Two to provide school meals in Malawi. They have so far donated over 3 million meals through sales of their own children's meal range.

At the start of the Covid pandemic, COOK began a scheme called the Kindness Fund which saw each of their company-owned shops donating meals every week to a local charity. This scheme has become a formal and ongoing part of the company's community outreach work.

Every year COOK publish a 'Purpose Report' to report back to employees and customers on their social impact and progress toward their impact targets.

COOK buy 100% renewable electricity for their Kitchens, shops and offices. As part of their Climate Action Plan, they have set themselves a target of becoming net zero in their carbon footprint by 2030.

Awards 
In 2005 COOK won ‘Rising Star of the Year’ at the Retail Week Awards and 'Best Retailer for Vegetarian Ready-meals' at the Vegetarian Society Awards

COOK re-branded in 2006 and won The Grocer Gold Award for 'Best Independent Retailer Chain'.

In June 2010, a year after COOK’s first franchises opened in 2009, they won the Express Newspapers Brand Builder Award at the  British Franchise Association HSBC Franchisor of the Year awards[2]

COOK dishes have won numerous  Great Taste Awards] over the years: 10 in 2010; 6 in 2011; 12 in 2012; 13 in 2013; and 9 in 2014. From 2019–21 they won a total of 53 Great Taste Awards.

In 2020 COOK received The Grocer Gold Award for Employer of the year COOK 'really cares about its employees' Grocer Award Judges. In the same year, they made the Feel-Good Brands List for 2021. The Feel-Good Brands list is published annually, curated by votes from an independent panel of industry experts and a survey of conscious consumers. 'Put simply it's good cooking that's doing good.' Feel Good Brands panel.

COOK have been shortlisted as Speciality Retailer Of The Year by Retail Week in 2022.

Partnerships
Cook products are also stocked in over 850 independent retailers and farm shops including Manx retailer Shoprite and Booths supermarkets in the North of England.

References

External links
 Official website

Retail companies of the United Kingdom
Food manufacturers of the United Kingdom
Companies based in Kent
Certified B Corporations in the Food & Beverage Industry